The Turkish State Railways (TCDD) 56301 Class is a class of 2-10-0 steam locomotives known as "Skyliners".  They were built by Vulcan Iron Works of Wilkes-Barre, Pennsylvania.  The 88 locomotives in this class were numbered 56301-88.  The first arrived in 1947.

They were the first American-built locomotives ordered by TCDD, though they had acquired ex-USATC S200 Class (TCDD 46201 Class) and ex-USATC S160 Class (TCDD 45171 Class).  This class had the largest boiler and firebox of any Turkish locomotive and were the only ones fitted with mechanical stokers.

At least 4 are known to be preserved, these being 56375 at the TCDD Open Air Steam Locomotive Museum in Ankara, 56337 at the Çamlık Railway Museum, 56378 at Tren Park within Karabük University, and 56359 stored serviceable at Çankırı.  The remains of 56369 and 56376 are also at Çankırı, serving as parts sources for 56359.

References

External links 
 56301 to 56388 Trains of Turkey

2-10-0 locomotives
56301
Steam locomotives of Turkey
Vulcan Iron Works locomotives
Standard gauge locomotives of Turkey
Railway locomotives introduced in 1947